Lucy Roberts (born 11 May 2001) is an English footballer who plays as a defender. She currently plays college soccer for South Florida Bulls.

She has previously played for Liverpool, Huddersfield Town on loan from Manchester United, and represented England at under-17 and under-19 level.

Club career

Liverpool 
Roberts joined Liverpool from Stoke City when she was 12 years old and progressed through the club's Centre of Excellence and Development squads, making her professional debut in an FA Cup game against Watford on 4 February 2018. In doing so she became Liverpool's youngest full debutant of the FA WSL era at the age of 16 years 269 days.

Manchester United 
On 1 July 2018, Roberts joined the newly formed Manchester United to compete in their inaugural season. She spent the season with the academy side, reaching the final of the FA WSL Academy Cup, and in the National League with Huddersfield Town, appearing six times and scoring two goals. She was released at the end of the season having not made a senior appearance for United.

South Florida Bulls 
On 17 July 2019, Roberts enrolled at the University of South Florida in the United States, to play in their women's soccer team. As a rookie Roberts was named to the Top Drawer Soccer Preseason Best XI freshman team and went on to make 17 appearances in her debut season, missing time due to national team obligations. At the end of the campaign she was one of only two unanimous selections to the All-AAC Rookie XI.

International career 
After helping the team to qualify, Roberts travelled to Lithuania in May 2018 as part of the England under-17 squad to compete in the UEFA Women's Under-17 Championship as the team reached the semi-finals. On 30 September 2019, Roberts was selected in the England under-19 squad that began the 2020 UEFA Under-19 Championship qualification. Three days later, Roberts scored her first goal in an 8–0 win against Cyprus.

Personal life 
Roberts is the great-great-granddaughter of Manchester United and England defender Charlie Roberts, who played for the club from 1904 to 1913 and became the first captain to lead United out at Old Trafford in 1910.

Career statistics

Club

References

External links 
 Profile at the South Florida Bulls website
 
 

2001 births
Living people
Footballers from Cheshire
Sportspeople from Crewe
Women's association football defenders
English women's footballers
Liverpool F.C. Women players
Manchester United W.F.C. players
Women's Super League players
English expatriate women's footballers
Expatriate women's soccer players in the United States
South Florida Bulls women's soccer players
English expatriate sportspeople in the United States
FA Women's National League players
Huddersfield Town W.F.C. players